The 2011 NC State Wolfpack football team represented North Carolina State University in the 2011 NCAA Division I FBS football season. The Wolfpack were led by fifth-year head coach Tom O'Brien and played their home games at Carter–Finley Stadium. They are members of the Atlantic Division of the Atlantic Coast Conference. They finished the season 8–5, 4–4 in ACC play to finish in fourth place in the Atlantic Division. They were invited to the Belk Bowl, where they defeated Louisville, 31–24.

Schedule

Game summaries

Clemson

References

NC State
NC State Wolfpack football seasons
Duke's Mayo Bowl champion seasons
NC State Wolfpack football